The Last Little Life EP is the first EP by American rock band The Rentals and is a collection of new material from the band in more than 8 years. Recorded by drummer Dan Joeright out of his Hollywood studio (dubbed - Outer Space Studio), The Last Little Life EP was released on August 14, 2007. In addition to three brand new tracks, the EP also includes a new reworking of "Sweetness and Tenderness" originally from the group's 1995 debut Return of the Rentals. Their third full-length album was to follow after the EP's release, But it was replaced by The multimedia project Songs About Time in 2009. A third album, named Lost in Alphaville, was eventually released in 2014 to positive reviews.

The title The Last Little Life comes from the first word of the three new songs on the album: "Last Romantic Day," "Little Bit of You in Everything," "Life Without a Brain."

Track listing

Personnel
Matt Sharp – vocals, acoustic guitar, synthesizers
Rachel Haden – bass, vocals, synthesizers
Sara Radle – guitar, vocals, piano, synthesizers, glockenspiel
Ben Pringle – synthesizers, trombone, acoustic guitar, vocals
Lauren Chipman – viola, vocals, synthesizers
Dan Joeright – drums, percussion, vocals, engineer, producer

References

2007 debut EPs
The Rentals albums